Scrobipalpula equatoriella is a moth in the family Gelechiidae. It was described by Bernard Landry in 2010. It is found on the Galápagos Islands.

References

Scrobipalpula
Moths described in 2010